Asha Leo (born 5 January 1982) is a British fashion model and television presenter of Welsh and Indian descent.

Career
She was discovered at the age of 13, which lead her becoming a model.

Upon moving to America, Leo hosted The Brit List on BBC America. After moving to Los Angeles she hosted red carpet award shows, commenting on celebrity style as well as films and television trivia.

On NBC she has hosted on both Access Hollywood and Access Hollywood Live. Her bi-weekly segment "Access Style Deals" focuses on the fashion trends.

Personal life
Leo grew up in Kingston-upon-Thames and attended The London College of Fashion where she earned a degree in Fashion Promotion, PR, and Journalism and Broadcast.
Leo attended Tiffin Girls' School.

References

External links

 
 
 
 

1982 births
English female models
Living people
English expatriates in the United States
English people of Indian descent
English people of Welsh descent
Models of Indian descent